Carver County is a county in the U.S. state of Minnesota. The county is mostly farmland and wilderness with many unincorporated townships. As of the 2020 census, the population was 106,922. Its county seat is Chaska. Carver County is named for explorer Jonathan Carver, who in 1766–67, traveled from Boston to the Minnesota River and wintered among the Sioux near the site of New Ulm. Carver County is part of the Minneapolis-St. Paul-Bloomington, MN-WI Metropolitan Statistical Area.

Statistics
In 2017, Carver County was ranked by the Robert Wood Johnson Foundation as the healthiest county in the State of Minnesota for the fifth year in a row. The foundation explained health outcomes represent “how healthy counties are within the state,” whereas health factors represent “an estimate of the future health of counties as compared with other counties within a state,” based on health behaviors, clinical care, and other environmental factors. Carver County continued to rank as the number one healthiest county throughout the state for 2018, 2019, and 2020.

In 2018, Carver County was ranked as the #1 "Happiest Place in America" according to a study conducted by the data firm Smart Asset. Carver County was one of three United States counties to receive a top 5 ranking for the third straight year. The other two counties were Loudoun and Fairfax counties in Virginia. The study compared counties across the country using the following eight factors: unemployment rate, poverty rate, affordability ratio, marriage rate, divorce rate, bankruptcy rate, life expectancy, and physical activity rate. In particular, Carver County scored well thanks to strong economic conditions with an unemployment rate of only 3.1% and a poverty rate of only 4.1%. Additionally, according to the data, 62% of residents were married and only 8% divorced. In each of those metrics, Carver ranked in the top 40 in the country.

Geography
The Minnesota River flows east-northeasterly along the county's southern border. The South Fork of the Crow River flows northeasterly through the upper western and central portions of the county. Carver Creek flows southeasterly from the county's central area, discharging into the Minnesota at the county's southern border. The terrain consists of low rolling hills, dotted with lakes in the eastern portion. The area is devoted to agriculture.
The terrain slopes to the east and south, with its northwest corner at 1,024' (312m) ASL. A small hill 1.6 miles (2.6 km) northeast of Miller Lake rises to 1,080' (329m) ASL, for the county's highest point.

It is Minnesota's second-smallest county by land area and third-smallest by total area.

Carver is one of seven southern Minnesota counties with no forest soils; only prairie ecosystems of savannas and prairies can be found in Carver County. It is also one of 17 Minnesota counties where savanna soils dominate.

Lakes
Carver County is home to seven lakes of 235 acres or larger. The largest is Lake Waconia, Minnesota's 73rd largest lake and the Twin Cities' second largest lake, with an area of 2,996 acres.

Major highways

  U.S. Highway 212
  Minnesota State Highway 5
  Minnesota State Highway 7
  Minnesota State Highway 25
  Minnesota State Highway 41
  Minnesota State Highway 284
 Carver County Road 10
 Carver County Road 11
 Carver County Road 33
 Other county roads

Adjacent counties

 Wright County – north
 Hennepin County – northeast
 Scott County – southeast
 Sibley County – southwest
 McLeod County – west

Protected areas

 Assumption State Wildlife Management Area
 Carver Park Preserve
 Gravel Pit State Wildlife Management Area
 Lake Minnewashta Regional Park
 Minnesota Landscape Arboretum
 Minnesota Valley National Wildlife Refuge (part)
 Minnesota Valley State Recreation Area (part)
 Waconia State Wildlife Management Area

Climate and weather

Demographics

2020 census

Note: the US Census treats Hispanic/Latino as an ethnic category. This table excludes Latinos from the racial categories and assigns them to a separate category. Hispanics/Latinos can be of any race.

2010
The ethnic makeup of the county, according to the 2010 census, was the following:
 93.7% White
 1.5% Black
 0.3% American Indian
 2.9% Asian
 0.0% Native Hawaiian or Pacific Islander
 1.6% Two or more races
 0.3% Other races
 4.1% Hispanic or Latino (of any race)

There were 33,486 households, out of which 42.1% had children under the age of 18 living with them, 62.9% were married couples living together, 7.6% had a female householder with no husband present, and 25.9% were non-families. 21.0% of all households were made up of individuals, and 6.9% had someone living alone who was 65 years of age or older. The average household size was 2.74 and the average family size was 3.22.

The median income for a household in the county was $83,773, and the median income for a family was $96,913. Males had a median income of $66,150 versus $46,696 for females. The per capita income for the county was $37,457. About 3.3% of families and 4.9% of the population were below the poverty line, including 5.5% of those under age 18 and 7.8% of those age 65 or over.

2000
As of the 2000 United States Census, there were 70,205 people, 24,356 households, and 18,778 families in the county. The population density was 198/sqmi (76.6/km2). There were 24,883 housing units at an average density of 70.3/sqmi (27.1/km2). The racial makeup of the county was 95.95% White, 0.59% Black or African American, 0.18% Native American, 1.56% Asian, 0.01% Pacific Islander, 0.87% from other races, and 0.82% from two or more races. 2.55% of the population were Hispanic or Latino of any race. 44.3% were of German, 12.1% Norwegian, 7.1% Irish and 6.2% Swedish ancestry.

There were 24,356 households, out of which 45.20% had children under the age of 18 living with them, 66.40% were married couples living together, 7.30% had a female householder with no husband present, and 22.90% were non-families. 18.10% of all households were made up of individuals, and 6.10% had someone living alone who was 65 years of age or older. The average household size was 2.84 and the average family size was 3.26.

The county population contained 31.50% under the age of 18, 6.90% from 18 to 24, 34.70% from 25 to 44, 19.50% from 45 to 64, and 7.50% who were 65 years of age or older. The median age was 34 years. For every 100 females there were 100.00 males. For every 100 females age 18 and over, there were 98.00 males.

The median income for a household in the county was $65,540, and the median income for a family was $73,577 (these figures had risen to $78,035 and $89,100 respectively as of a 2007 estimate). Males had a median income of $47,271 versus $32,107 for females. The per capita income for the county was $28,486. About 2.30% of families and 3.50% of the population were below the poverty line, including 3.60% of those under age 18 and 6.90% of those age 65 or over.

Economy
According to the county's comprehensive annual financial reports, the top employers by number of employees in the county are the following. ("NR" indicates the employer was not ranked among the top ten employers that year.)

Government and politics

Government
Like all counties in Minnesota, Carver is governed by an elected and nonpartisan board of commissioners. Each commissioner represents a district of approximately equal population.

County commissioners
The county commission elects a chair, who presides at meetings.
Commissioners as of January 2020:

Politics
As Carver County becomes more suburban and less rural in character, with 90% of its residents now living in its cities, it is becoming more of a battleground territory, especially in the eastern half of the county and in its two largest cities, Chaska and Chanhassen. Traditionally, the county has tended to vote for Republicans. Since World War II, the county has never voted for a Democratic candidate for president. The last time Carver County voted for a Democrat was in 1932, Franklin D. Roosevelt's landslide win against incumbent Herbert Hoover, and the only other occurrence since 1896 was Woodrow Wilson in 1912, when the Republicans were bitterly divided. As a measure of how Republican the county has been over the years, it was one of only four counties in the entire state to support Barry Goldwater in 1964 over Lyndon Johnson. This is one of only five times since 1932 that a Democrat has managed 40 percent of the county's vote.

Carver's Republican bent is not limited to presidential elections. The county regularly rejects Democrats in gubernatorial races as well. Since 1944, the only time Carver County voted for a non-Republican candidate in a gubernatorial race was in 1998, Jesse Ventura’s third-party upset.

Carver County is split between two congressional districts. The eastern area, adjacent to Hennepin County and Scott County and including Chaska and Chanhassen, is in Minnesota's 3rd congressional district (CPVI D+6); the remainder of the county is in Minnesota's 6th congressional district (CPVI R+12).

Communities

Cities

 Carver
 Chanhassen (Partly in Hennepin County)
 Chaska
 Cologne
 Hamburg
 Mayer
 New Germany
 Norwood Young America
 Victoria
 Waconia
 Watertown

Unincorporated communities

 Assumption
 Augusta
 Bongards
 Coney Island
 Crown College
 Dahlgren
 East Union
 Gotha
 Hazelton
 Hollywood
 Maple
 Oster
 San Francisco (ghost town)

Townships

 Benton Township
 Camden Township
 Dahlgren Township
 Hancock Township
 Hollywood Township
 Laketown Township
 San Francisco Township
 Waconia Township
 Watertown Township
 Young America Township

Notable residents

 Abigail and Brittany Hensel
 Prince (musician)
 Wendelin Grimm
 Steve Strachan (sheriff)

Arc Carnes (artist) -

See also
 National Register of Historic Places listings in Carver County, Minnesota

References

External links

 Carver County government’s website
 Macaroni Kid Carver – family friendly events newsletter

 
Minnesota counties
Minneapolis–Saint Paul
1855 establishments in Minnesota Territory